Janet Omorogbe (born 22 November 1942) is a Nigerian sprinter. She competed in the women's 4 × 100 metres relay at the 1968 Summer Olympics.

References

External links
 

1942 births
Living people
Athletes (track and field) at the 1968 Summer Olympics
Athletes (track and field) at the 1970 British Commonwealth Games
Nigerian female sprinters
Olympic athletes of Nigeria
Place of birth missing (living people)
Commonwealth Games competitors for Nigeria
Olympic female sprinters
20th-century Nigerian women